Segreti segreti (internationally released as Secrets Secrets) is a 1985 Italian drama film directed by Giuseppe Bertolucci. For this film Lina Sastri was awarded with a David di Donatello for Best Actress. The film was on first viewing TV Monday 15 December 1986 on Canale 5 at 20:30 (then it was broadcast other times on Telemontecarlo, on RAI or on local TVs in any region).

Cast 
 Lina Sastri: Laura
 Lea Massari: Marta, Laura's mother
 Giulia Boschi: Rosa
 Rossana Podestà: Maria, Rosa's mother
 Alida Valli: Gina 
 Stefania Sandrelli: Renata 
 Mariangela Melato: Giuliana 
 Nicoletta Braschi
 Massimo Ghini
 Francesca Archibugi
 Sandra Ceccarelli

References

External links

1985 films
Italian drama films
Films directed by Giuseppe Bertolucci
Films with screenplays by Vincenzo Cerami
1985 drama films
Films scored by Nicola Piovani
1980s Italian films